Mohamed Thiemokho Traore (born 15 August 2002) is a Senegalese professional footballer who plays as a defender for USL Championship club Phoenix Rising, on loan from Major League Soccer club Los Angeles FC.

Club career
Born in Dakar, Traore joined soccer institute of Montverde Academy in 2016. On 17 August 2020, Los Angeles FC announced the signing of Traore using the top spot in the MLS waiver order. He made his professional debut on 10 September 2020 in a 3–0 defeat against Real Salt Lake.

On 28 February 2023, Traore was loaned out to USL Championship side Phoenix Rising for the 2023 season.

Career statistics

Honors
Los Angeles FC
Supporters' Shield: 2022

References

External links
Profile at the Los Angeles FC website

2002 births
Living people
Footballers from Dakar
Association football defenders
Senegalese footballers
Los Angeles FC players
Las Vegas Lights FC players
Phoenix Rising FC players
Major League Soccer players
USL Championship players
Senegalese expatriate footballers
Senegalese expatriate sportspeople in the United States
Expatriate soccer players in the United States
Montverde Academy alumni